Clark Atlanta University (CAU or Clark Atlanta) is a private, Methodist, historically black research university in Atlanta, Georgia. Clark Atlanta is the first Historically Black College or University (HBCU) in the Southern United States. Founded on September 19, 1865, as Atlanta University, it consolidated with Clark College (established 1869) to form Clark Atlanta University in 1988. It is classified among "R2: Doctoral Universities – High research activity".

History 
Atlanta University was founded on September 19, 1865, as the first HBCU in the Southern United States. Atlanta University was the nation's first graduate institution to award degrees to African Americans in the Nation and the first to award bachelor's degrees to African Americans in the South; Clark College (1869) was the nation's first four-year liberal arts college to serve African-American students. The two consolidated in 1988 to form Clark Atlanta University.

Atlanta University 

In the city of Atlanta, while the Civil War was well underway, two literate African American ex-slaves, James Tate and Grandison B. Daniels, in 1862 established the first school in Atlanta for African American children. It was located on the corner of Courtland and Jenkins Streets in an old church building of Friendship Baptist Church, the original home of First Baptist Church. Tate and Daniels, along with 25 other former slaves, founded Friendship Baptist Church, the first black Baptist autonomous congregation. They began holding classes in an old church building built in 1848. The building was badly damaged during the Siege of Atlanta in 1864. The school would later become Atlanta University in September 1865.

When white missionary Reverend Frederick Ayer, along with his wife, arrived in Atlanta in November 1865 under the auspices of the American Missionary Association, the AMA church purchased a boxcar for $310 in Chattanooga, Tennessee, and sent it to Friendship by the Ninth Street Baptist Church of Cincinnati, Ohio. The modest space of the boxcar served two purposes: a new teaching space for Atlanta University and a meeting space for the Friendship Church congregation. Tate and Daniels readily transferred their responsibilities to Ayer, who was better prepared to lead the educational effort, in 1865.

Atlanta University was founded on September 19, 1865 by James Tate and Grandison Daniels. Two years later, Edmund Asa Ware of the American Missionary Association was appointed the first president. Atlanta University was chartered in 1867 with the assistance from Oliver Otis Howard of the Freedmen's Bureau. He also appointed William J. White as educational agent of the Freedmen's Bureau on January 12, 1867. White was the half-brother of founder James Tate and was the co-founder of the Augusta Institute in 1867, which would become Morehouse College. He served as trustee of Atlanta University in 1869.

Atlanta University—now Clark Atlanta University—is the first HBCU in the Southern United States, and the nation's oldest graduate institution serving a predominantly African-American student body.  It was chartered on October 17, 1867. It offered its first instruction at the postsecondary level in 1869. Its first graduating class was in 1873 (normal school for future teachers including women), and it awarded its first six bachelor's degrees in June 1876.

Atlanta University was the first to accept women, and the first HBCU to have a women's dormitory, North Hall, built in 1869. One woman earned a bachelor's degree from Atlanta University between 1876 and 1895. Seven women received bachelor's degrees from Atlanta University between 1895 and 1900. Atlanta University awarded bachelor's degrees 53 years (1876-1929) before exclusively offering graduate degrees.

A 1912 catalog shows that Atlanta University had three divisions—the college and the normal school, each with a preparatory division. Enrollment that year was 403-40 college students, 62 normal students, 115 high school students in the college prep program and 183 high school students in the normal program. At that time half of the Atlanta University alumni were employed in teaching. There were a group of small Black colleges in Atlanta - Atlanta, Morehouse, Spelman, Clark, Morris Brown and Gammon - each guarding its independence but each dependent on Northern philanthropy. By the end of World War I, the Northern philanthropists were demanding mergers to improve educational quality. 1929 saw the creation of the Atlanta University Affiliation, in which Atlanta University took on a new role as the graduate school, with Morehouse and Spelman as undergraduate colleges. Before World War II, the Affiliation came to include other Black colleges in Atlanta. By 1988, Atlanta University merged with Clark College, becoming Clark Atlanta University on July 1, 1988.

North Hall - now Gaines Hall (Morris Brown College)
Atlanta University began on West Mitchell, about a mile from downtown Atlanta. Built in 1869 by architect William H. Parkins, North Hall, now Gaines Hall, marked the first female dormitory on the campus of a co-ed school in the United States. Gaines Hall stood as Atlanta University's initial original building. A year later, South Hall opened for boys. Wings were added to each in 1871 and 1880. In 1882, Stone Hall opened as the main building, containing the chapel, lecture halls, recitation rooms, laboratories and administrative offices. By 1905 four more permanent buildings had been added, including a Carnegie Library. North Hall is the middle building, flanked by South Hall (left) and North Hall. South Hall was later demolished by Morris Brown College. A fire in mid-August 2015 threatened to raze the building completely. In October 2017, a court ruling returned the property to Clark Atlanta University.

Stanley Pritchett, Morris Brown's former president, shows a photo of Atlanta University students taken on what is now Morris Brown's campus.

Stone Hall - now Fountain Hall (Morris Brown College)
Erected in 1882 on the crest of Diamond Hill on the Morris Brown College campus, Fountain Hall is one of the earlier structures for the original site of Atlanta University. Historically, the hall is significant to the city, state, and nation for its role in providing higher education to Blacks in this country. It was for this reason that Fountain Hall was made a National Historic Landmark in 1975. Architecturally, this building is important as a work of G. L. Norrman. This Atlanta architect was active during the late nineteenth and very early twentieth centuries, but few of his works have survived. The three-story, red brick structure is also an excellent example of the High Victorian style, its clock tower a rare sight in Atlanta. Over its 138-year history, Fountain Hall has served as the location for administrative offices, as well as a number of other university activities, contributing greatly to the cultural fabric of the city through the education of its citizens.

From its construction in 1882 until 1929, Fountain Hall primarily functioned as the administration building for Atlanta University, though it contained a chapel, library, recitation rooms, and laboratories during various times in its history. It served in a similar capacity for Morris Brown College for many years. Currently, the structure contains offices, a chapel, art studios, and a gallery. Fountain Hall has been a gathering place and focus of activity in the education process of many of the mostly Black Americans attending the university and college since its construction. Because of the building's location, Fountain Hall can be seen from some distance and has long served as an impressive and identifying landmark for the historic Atlanta University Center.

In the early 1930s, Morris Brown College was in financial trouble and was forced to give up its property at Houston and Boulevard. Since its affiliation with Spelman and Morehouse, Atlanta University was no longer using several of its original buildings. In 1932, Bishop W. A. Fountain, former college president and then chairman of the Board of Trustees, and his son, W. A. Fountain, Jr., President of Morris Brown, negotiated for the college to become part of the university system and lease some of the vacant buildings on the old campus. After this, Stone Hall became known as Fountain Hall, named for Bishop William A. Fountain. In the 1929, the college deeded the buildings, establishing a permanent home for Morris Brown College.

The Atlanta University campus was moved to its present site, and the modern organization of the Atlanta University Center emerged, with Clark College, Morris Brown College, and the Interdenominational Theological Center joining the affiliation later. The story of the Atlanta University over the next twenty years after 1930 includes many significant developments. Graduate Schools of Library Science, Education, and Business Administration were established in 1941, 1944, and 1946, respectively. The Atlanta School of Social Work, long associated with the university, gave up its charter in 1947 to become an integral part of the university. In 1957, the controlling boards of the six institutions (Atlanta University; Clark, Morehouse, Morris Brown and Spelman Colleges; and Gammon Theological Seminary) ratified new articles of affiliation. The new contract created the Atlanta University Center. The influence of Atlanta University has been extended through professional journals and organizations, including Phylon, and through the work of Dr. W. E. B. Du Bois, a member of the center.

The significance of Atlanta University Center rests in the quality of its leaders, faculty, and graduates. Edmund Asa Ware was Atlanta University's spiritual and intellectual father. His dedication to academic excellence and rejection of racial inferiority influenced other black colleges and American education in general. John Hope, former Morehouse president and Atlanta University's first black president, is noted in every history of American education during the first half of this century. Atlanta University's most famous faculty member (1897-1910) was W. E. B. DuBois, who began the Atlanta Studies on Negro Sociology and later became the director of publications for the NAACP.

The influential Atlanta Sociological Laboratory was founded at Atlanta University in 1895.

Clark College

Clark College was founded in 1869 by the Methodist Episcopal Church, which later became the United Methodist Church as the nation's first four-year liberal arts college to serve the primarily African-American student population. Originally named Clark University, the school was chartered and incorporated in 1877. It first offered instruction at the postsecondary level in 1879, and awarded its first degree (baccalaureate) in 1880. It became Clark College in 1940. It was named for Bishop Davis Wasgatt Clark, who was the first President of the Freedman's Aid Society and became Bishop in 1864. A sparsely furnished room in Clark Chapel, a Methodist Episcopal church in Atlanta's Summerhill section, housed the first Clark College class. In 1871, the school relocated to a new site on the newly purchased Whitehall and McDaniel Street property. In 1877, the School was chartered as Clark University.

An early benefactor, Bishop Gilbert Haven, visualized Clark as the "university" of all the Methodist schools founded for the education of freedmen. After the school changed locations several times, Bishop Haven, who succeeded Bishop Clark, was instrumental in acquiring  in South Atlanta, where in 1880 the school conferred its first degree. In 1883, Clark established a theology department named for Dr. Elijah H. Gammon. In 1888 the Gammon School of Theology became an independent theological seminary, and is currently part of the Interdenominational Theological Center. Clark College merged with Atlanta University on July 1, 1988 to form Clark Atlanta University.

Philanthropy
In 2020, MacKenzie Scott donated $15 million to Clark Atlanta University. Her donation is the largest single gift in the history of the institution.

Campus 

Residential facilities

All undergraduate students with under 58 credits hours are required to live on campus.

First-Year housing
Beckwith Hall (men)
Holmes Hall (women)
Merner Hall (women)
Pfeiffer Hall (women)

Upperclassmen housing
CAU Suites East / West (co-ed)
Heritage Commons (co-ed)
James P. Brawley Hall (co-ed)

Graduate housing
Beckwith Village (co-ed)

Academics

Clark Atlanta offers undergraduate and graduate degrees through the following schools:
School of Arts & Science
School of Business
School of Education
School of Social Work

Clark Atlanta is the most comprehensive institution in the Atlanta University Center, offering over 40 degrees at the bachelor's, master's, and doctoral levels.

Clark Atlanta is annually ranked on the list of The Washington Monthly "Best Colleges and Universities" and consistently ranked a top 25 HBCU by U.S. News & World Report (No. 23).

The Isabella T. Jenkins Honors Program is a selective academic program established to provide a close-knit and uniquely stimulating community for high-achieving undergraduates at Clark Atlanta.

Clark Atlanta's social work graduate program consistently ranks among the 100 best in the nation by U.S. News & World Report.

Clark Atlanta's Center for Functional Nanoscale Measures (CFNM) has produced more black Ph.D.s in Nanoscale Science than any HBCU in the nation.

Student life

Student body
Annually between 30 and 40% of students are Georgia residents, while the remaining come from outside Georgia. Approximately 25% of students are male and 75% are female. In 2018, 89% of students identified as African-American/Black, 7% identified as other/unknown, and 4% identified as international.

CAU Experience 
All new undergraduate students are required to attend "CAU Experience", which is five days of events orchestrated to help them get better acquainted with the legacy, traditions, culture, and community of Clark Atlanta University. The preeminent scheduled event is the formal induction ceremony where new undergraduate students are officially inducted as CAU Panthers. CAU Experience is mostly led by enthusiastic and trained student leaders known as "OGs", Orientation Guides.

Athletics 

Clark Atlanta University, known athletically as the Panthers, competes within the Southern Intercollegiate Athletic Conference (SIAC) of the National Collegiate Athletic Association (NCAA), Division II. Men's sports include baseball, basketball, cross country, football and track & field; women's sports include basketball, cross country, softball, tennis, track & field and volleyball.

Marching band 
The university's marching band is known as the Mighty Marching Panther Band. "Essence" is the dance-line featured with the marching band. The band was featured in the 2002 movie Drumline.

National fraternities and sororities
All nine of the National Pan-Hellenic Council organizations have chapters established at Clark Atlanta University. Other Greek letter organizations registered on campus include Sigma Alpha Iota, Gamma Sigma Sigma, Kappa Kappa Psi, Phi Mu Alpha Sinfonia, Tau Beta Sigma and Gamma Phi Delta.

National Pan-Hellenic Council
About two percent of undergraduate men and three percent of undergraduate women are active in CAU's National Pan-Hellenic Council.

Student media

The CAU Panther 
The CAU Panther is the student newspaper.

CAU-TV 
CAU-TV is a public access channel licensed by Comcast to the university.

WSTU 
WSTU is the CAU student-run internet radio station.

WCLK 
CAU operates WCLK (91.9 FM), Atlanta's only jazz radio station and one of the longest running in the world.

Notable alumni

This is a list of notable alumni which includes graduates, non-graduate former students, and current students of Atlanta University, Clark College, Clark University, and/or Clark Atlanta University. It does not include other notable persons who may have attended Clark Atlanta University as cross-registered students (credit as an alumnus is not given to Clark Atlanta University, which has spurred controversy over the school's cross-registration policies).

Notable faculty and administrators

See also 

 Panther Stadium
UNCF
List of colleges and universities in metropolitan Atlanta
 List of historically black colleges of the United States

References

Further reading
 Atlanta University Publications: a series, which began in 1896, of studies on problems affecting black people in the United States, edited by W. E. B. Du Bois.

External links 

 
 
 
 
 
 

 
Historically black universities and colleges in the United States
Universities and colleges accredited by the Southern Association of Colleges and Schools
Private universities and colleges in Georgia (U.S. state)
Universities and colleges in Atlanta
Educational institutions established in 1988
American Missionary Association
Schools supported by the Freedmen's Bureau
Universities and colleges formed by merger in the United States
1988 establishments in Georgia (U.S. state)